Mike Nappa (born December 10, 1963) is an Arab-American author of more than 60 books and an entertainment journalist for the e-magazine, PopFam.com "Pop Culture for Families." Although he's published books for all ages with many different companies, he's best known for his work in children's religious publishing where he created the award-winning comic book characters, Johnny Grav & The Visioneer, and co-created the VeggieTales comic book characters, the Quitter Critter Quad Squad.

Biography
Nappa was born in Norman, Oklahoma. He started his career as a youth pastor, and then transitioned to writing church resources at Group Publishing in Colorado. He eventually joined Group as a book acquisitions editor and remained active as an author. In 1995, Nappa left Group Publishing to start his own company, Nappaland Communications Inc., which became the parent company for Nappaland Literary Agency and the long-running e-magazine, PopFam.com "Pop Culture for Families." Since then he has published over 60 books which have collectively sold more than a million copies worldwide. He has also served as a fiction acquisitions editor for Barbour Publishing, as a general acquisitions editor (fiction and non-fiction) for David C. Cook publishers, as Editor in Chief of the short-lived Destination Magazine (published by the now-defunct Private Escapes Luxury Destination Clubs), and as Publications Director for Blue Margin Inc.

In 2000, Nappa created the award-winning serialized comic book characters, Johnny Grav & The Visioneer, for Clubhouse kids magazine. That comic ran for three consecutive years in the magazine, from January 2000 through December 2002. The Johnny Grav characters returned in 2010 for another three-year run in Clubhouse (2010–2012), which included a serialized prose novel called Nightmare City that ran both in print and online.

In 2015, Nappa joined the VeggieTales universe as a writer for the VeggieTales Super Comics line of graphic novels and comic books created under license from DreamWorks / Big Idea Entertainment (B&H Kids). In this capacity he adapted classic VeggieTales videos into comic book format, and also co-created new Veggie characters for the original comic book story, LarryBoy and the Quitter Critter Squad. In 2017, he was featured in the Bibleman universe (B&H Kids) and also began publishing the independent fantasy comic, Chihuahuas Are Lucky (Walking Carnival Comics) with acclaimed illustrator Dennis Edwards.

Although he published several suspense novels under the pen name "Sharon Carter Rogers", it was not until 2016 that Nappa began publishing adult fiction under his own name: the Coffey & Hill trilogy of suspense novels. Each of these novels features an Atlanta-based private detective team investigating an Edgar Allan Poe-themed mystery. The first book in Coffey & Hill was Annabel Lee, and the second was The Raven, both published by Revell (Baker Publishing Group). The third book in the series, A Dream Within a Dream, was co-authored with Melissa Kosci and released from Revell in 2020. A Dream Within a Dream was delayed several years due to the death of Nappa's wife, Amy, in late 2016.

Hard Way Home, a memoir of the passing of his wife (and frequent co-author), Amy Nappa, was released in 2019.

In 2020, Nappa joined the gaming industry, working as a narrative designer/scriptwriter for Talofa Games on the AR app Run to My Heart created in association with Niantic (Pokémon Go; Harry Potter: Wizards Unite).

Current bibliography
 Reflections for the Grieving Soul (Zondervan) 2023
 Bible-Smart: Matthew (Tyndale House/Rose Publishing) 2023
 Welcome to Bible World (The Good Book Company) 2022
 29 Days to Different: Love (Hendrickson-Rose Publishing) 2021
 The Promises of Jesus (Our Daily Bread Publishing) 2020
 A Dream Within a Dream (Revell) 2020
 Hard Way Home (Harvest House Publishers) 2019
 Bibleman and the Wish-a-Prayer Machine (B&H Kids) 2018
 Hercules: Whisper of the Gods (Walking Carnival Comics) 2017
 Bibleman Bible Storybook (B&H Kids) 2017
 Chihuahuas Are Lucky #1 (Walking Carnival Comics) 2017
 The Raven (Revell) 2016
 VeggieTales: LarryBoy and the Quitter Critter Quad Squad (B&H Kids / Big Idea Entertainment) 2016
 VeggieTales: Minnesota Cuke and the Search for Samson's Hairbrush (B&H Kids / Big Idea Entertainment) 2016
 VeggieTales: Where's God When I'm S-Scared? (B&H Kids / Big Idea Entertainment) 2016
 Annabel Lee (Revell) 2016
 VeggieTales Super Comics Volume 4 (B&H Kids / Big Idea Entertainment) 2015
 Johnny Grav & The Visioneer in Twilight Rising (Walking Carnival Books) 2013
 Nightmare City: Starring Johnny Grav & The Visioneer (Walking Carnival Books) 2013
 God in Slow Motion (Thomas Nelson Publishers) 2013
 Instant Family Devotions (Baker Books) 2012
 When Pigs Fly (Group Publishing) 2012
 The Jesus Survey (Baker Books) 2012
 Sky iOpeners (Group VBS) 2012
 77 Reasons Why Your Book Was Rejected (Sourcebooks) 2011
 Instant Small Group (Baker Books) 2011
 Pogo’s Prank-a-Palooza Day (Group Publishing) 2011
 PandaMania iOpeners (Group VBS) 2011
 Hometown Nazareth iGrow Chart (Group VBS) 2011
 Interactive Illustrations (Standard Publishing) 2010
 Creative Family Prayer Times (NavPress) 2007
 Make it Stick (Group Publishing) (contributor) 2007
 Heartwarming Christmas Stories (David C. Cook) (contributor) 2006
 The New Men’s Devotional Bible (Zondervan) (contributor) 2006
 Tuesdays with Matthew (David C. Cook) 2003
 Growing Up Fatherless (Baker Books) 2003
 Faith 4 Life: Getting Along with Others (Group Publishing) 2003
 Who Moved My Church (RiverOak Publishing) (foreword by John Maxwell) 2001
 The Prayer of Jesus (Barbour Publishing) 2001
 Zachary’s Zoo (Zonderkidz) 2000, 2007
 A Mind Like His (Barbour Publishing) 2000
 Lunch Box Promises (Standard Publishing) 2000
 Lunch Box Trivia (Standard Publishing) 2000
 Lunch Box Laughs (Standard Publishing) 2000
 True Stories of Transformed Lives (Tyndale House Publishers) 1999
 True Stories of Answered Prayers (Tyndale House Publishers) 1999
 What I Wish My Youth Leader Knew about Youth Ministry (Standard Publishing) 1999
 A Heart Like His (Barbour Publishing) 1999
 Legacy of Joy (Barbour Publishing) 1998
 The Heart of a Father (Barbour Publishing) 1998
 Imagine That (Augsburg Books) 1998
 Family Nights Tool Chest: Wisdom Life Skills (David C. Cook) 1998
 Family Nights Tool Chest: Christian Character Qualities (David C. Cook) 1998
 It’s a Sheep’s Life (Standard Publishing) 1997
 Faith Happens (Standard Publishing) 1997
 Family Nights Tool Chest: Basic Christian Beliefs (Group Publishing) 1997
 An Introduction to Family Nights (David C. Cook) 1997
 Get Real (Group Publishing) 1996
 52 Fun Family Prayer Adventures (Augsburg Books) 1996
 Noah, Noah, What’ll We Do? (Group Publishing) 1996
 Do You See the Star? (Group Publishing) 1996
 Jesus What’s for Lunch? (Group Publishing) 1996
 Little Lamb, Where Did You Go? (Group Publishing) 1996
 Bible Hero Adventures: Old Testament (Group Publishing) (contributor) 1996
 Bible Hero Adventures: New Testament (Group Publishing) (contributor) 1996
 Bore No More! (Group Publishing) 1995
 1996 Just-Plan It Daily Organizer (Group Publishing) 1995
 1995–1996 Student Plan-It Calendar (Group Publishing) 1995
 52 Fun Family Devotions (Augsburg Books) 1994
 The Youth Worker’s Encyclopedia of Bible-Teaching Ideas: Old Testament (Group Publishing) (series editor; contributor) 1994
 The Youth Worker’s Encyclopedia of Bible-Teaching Ideas: New Testament (Group Publishing) (series editor; contributor) 1994
 The Church: What am I Doing Here? (Group Publishing) 1993
 1993–1994 Student Plan-It Calendar (Group Publishing) 1993
 Reaching Out to a Hurting World (Group Publishing) 1992
 Accepting Others (Group Publishing) 1992
 The Youth Bible (Word Publishing) 1991 (contributor)

References

External links
 Nappaland web address
 Amazon author page
 Mike Nappa on Beliefnet.com
 Mike Nappa on Crosswalk.com
 Why Are Girls Suddenly Into Comics? by Mike Nappa
 Coffey & Hill trilogy
 Mike Nappa on ThriveThroughData.com
 Talofa Games web address

Living people
20th-century American novelists
21st-century American novelists
American male novelists
Novelists from Oklahoma
1963 births
20th-century American male writers
21st-century American male writers